Saint-Martin-sur-Oust (literally Saint-Martin on Oust) is a commune in the Morbihan department of Brittany in north-western France.  Until 6 October 2008 it was known as Saint-Martin. Inhabitants of Saint-Martin-sur-Oust are called in French Martinais.

See also
Communes of the Morbihan department

References

External links

 Mayors of Morbihan Association 

Saintmartinsuroust